Solomona Sakalia (born 2 February 1991) is a New Zealand rugby union player, who currently plays as a loosehead prop for  in New Zealand's domestic National Provincial Championship competition.

In October 2012, he was named in the  squad for the 2013 Super Rugby season, but did not play a Super Rugby game for the franchise. He did play two games for the Chiefs Development team in 2013.

Sakalia was a member of the New Zealand Under 20 side that won the 2011 IRB Junior World Championship.

References

External links
NZ Rugby History profile
itsrugby.co.uk profile

1991 births
Living people
People educated at Wellington College (New Zealand)
New Zealand rugby union players
Rugby union players from Wellington City
New Zealand sportspeople of Samoan descent
New Zealand people of Tokelauan descent
Rugby union props
Wellington rugby union players
Bay of Plenty rugby union players
Manawatu rugby union players
Chiefs (rugby union) players